Elżbieta Jarosz (born August 14, 1971) is a retired female long-distance runner from Poland. She won the 1999 edition of the Cologne Marathon, clocking 2:34:23 on October 3, 1999.

Achievements

Personal bests
Half marathon – 1:15:04 hrs (2003)
Marathon – 2:30:15 hrs (2001)

References

1971 births
Living people
Polish female long-distance runners
Place of birth missing (living people)
Polish female marathon runners
Zawisza Bydgoszcz athletes
20th-century Polish women
21st-century Polish women